Kenneth Ina Dorothea Taylor (born 16 May 2002) is a Dutch professional footballer who plays as a defensive midfielder for Eredivisie club Ajax and the Netherlands national team.

Club career
Taylor made his Eerste Divisie debut for Jong Ajax on 15 October 2018 in a game against Jong PSV as a 70th-minute substitute for Jasper ter Heide.

Taylor made his Eredivisie debut for AFC Ajax on 12 December 2020 in a game against PEC Zwolle as a 64th-minute substitute for Perr Schuurs. In a match against Heracles Almelo on 6 February 2022 Taylor scored his first Eredivisie goal in the match's 65th minute. He had come on in the 63rd minute to relieve Steven Berghuis and was shortly thereafter found on a ball from Sébastien Haller for what was his first league goal.

International career

Taylor played for various Dutch youth teams from 2017 to 2019.

On 22 September 2022, Taylor made his debut for the Netherlands in a 2022–23 UEFA Nations League match against Poland.

Career statistics

Club

International

Honours
Ajax
 Eredivisie: 2020–21, 2021–22
 KNVB Cup: 2020–21

Netherlands U17
UEFA European Under-17 Championship: 2019

Individual
 Eredivisie Talent of the Month: November 2022

References

External links
 Profile at the AFC Ajax website
 Career stats - Voetbal International
 

2002 births
Living people
Dutch people of American descent
Sportspeople from Alkmaar
Dutch footballers
Footballers from North Holland
Association football defenders
Association football midfielders
Netherlands international footballers
Netherlands youth international footballers
2022 FIFA World Cup players
Eredivisie players
Eerste Divisie players
AFC Ajax players
Jong Ajax players